Naval flag may refer to:

Maritime flag
Naval ensign
Naval jack

See also
Lists of naval flags